The term London Poles might refer to either of the following:

 Poles in the United Kingdom, most notably in the London borough of Ealing
 Polish government in exile set up in France during World War II and then transferred to London in 1940